The qualification for the 1960 AFC Asian Cup consisted of 10 teams in three zones with the winners of each zone joining South Korea in the final tournament.

Zones

 * Withdrew
 **  declined to participate due to an AFC membership dispute.

Central zone 
All matches held in Singapore.

Eastern zone 
All matches held in Philippines.

Western zone 
All matches held in India.

Qualified teams

References 

Jovanoic, Bojan; Morrison, Neil; Panahi, Majeed; Veroeveren, Pieter. "Asian Nations Cup 1960". RSSSF.

AFC Asian Cup qualification
Qualification, 1960
Afc Asian Cup Qualification, 1960
Afc Asian Cup Qualification, 1960
Afc Asian Cup Qualification, 1960
Q